Ingvar Svahn (22 May 1938 – 16 June 2008) was a Swedish footballer who played as a midfielder.

Career
Svahn played 255 matches for Malmö FF. He became Swedish champion three times and capped 19 times for the national team. In 1967 Svahn won the award for Swedish Footballer of the Year, Guldbollen. Svahn was famous for being a very fair player, he wasn't given a red or yellow card for ten seasons.

References

1938 births
2008 deaths
Swedish footballers
Footballers from Skåne County
Malmö FF players
Allsvenskan players
Footballers from Malmö
Sweden international footballers
Expatriate footballers in Belgium
Association football midfielders